Anderson Ranch Dam is an earth rockfill type dam in the western United States, on the South Fork of the Boise River in southwestern Idaho. In Elmore County northeast of Mountain Home, it is several miles north of U.S. Route 20 and operated by the U.S. Bureau of Reclamation.

When completed  in 1950, Anderson Ranch was the tallest dam of its type in the world. Its primary purpose is to provide irrigation water for agriculture, with a secondary purpose of hydroelectric power. Its generating capacity was increased from 27 to 40 MW in 1986.

The construction of the dam began in 1941 and experienced numerous challenges with materials, fuel, and labor shortages during World War II. Work was halted for over nine months beginning in late December 1942. The Reclamation Act of 1902 had racial exclusions on labor which were strictly adhered to until Congress changed the law in 1943. This allowed Japanese American internees to work on Reclamation projects; Anderson Ranch utilized internees from the Minidoka War Relocation Center, northeast of Twin Falls.

The South Fork of the Boise River originates in the Smoky Mountains north of Fairfield. Its watershed includes portions of the Smoky Mountains, Soldier Mountains, Boise National Forest, and Sawtooth National Forest. Below the dam, the South Fork flows northwestward into the reservoir behind the concrete Arrowrock Dam, completed in 1915.

The project is scheduled for completion in the summer of 2024.

References

External links

USBR.gov  - Bureau of Reclamation - Anderson Ranch Dam
Idaho Dept. of Water Resources - Anderson Ranch Dam
USBR.gov - major storage reservoirs in the Boise & Payette River basins - current levels & flows

Dams in Idaho
Reservoirs in Idaho
Hydroelectric power plants in Idaho
Buildings and structures in Elmore County, Idaho
United States Bureau of Reclamation dams
Dams completed in 1950
Energy infrastructure completed in 1950
Boise Project